"Yabba-Dabba-Doo!" is the catchphrase of Fred Flintstone. 

Yabba Dabba Doo may also refer to:
 Yabba Dabba Doo! The Happy World of Hanna-Barbera, a 1977 American live-action/animated television special
 The Hanna-Barbera Hall of Fame: Yabba Dabba Doo II, a 1979 sequel
 Hanna-Barbera's 50th: A Yabba Dabba Doo Celebration, a 1989 sequel
 Yabba Dabba Doo!, 1986 video game based on The Flintstones
 "The King Is Gone (So Are You)", 1989 novelty song performed by George Jones, originally titled "Ya Ba Da Ba Do (So Are You)"
 I Yabba-Dabba Do!, 1993 animated film based on The Flintstones

See also
 Yabba (disambiguation)
 Dabba (disambiguation)
 Doo (disambiguation)